Tomasz Knapik (16 September 1943 – 6 September 2021) was a Polish film, radio and television voice-over translation artist (known as lektor in Polish), doctor of electrical engineering by education, lecturer at the Faculty of Transport of the Warsaw University of Technology. He was called legendary in the voice-over translation field in Poland.

Career 
He started his media career at the radio station Rozgłośnia Harcerska. Then he worked in the Polish Radio (mainly in Trójka) and the Telewizja Polska (TVP). While working at TVP, he read live foreign films as a voice-over and materials for the Telewizyjny Kurier Warszawski. At the beginning of the 1990s, when Poland saw the greatest boom in videotapes, he read many films issued by official distributors. He also happened to read films published by pirate companies. Among all the films he read, there were many classics of action cinema, as well as a lot of B-class and C-class movies. He was a regular employee of such Polish distributors as: Imperial, Vision, Best Film, NVC VIM, ITI Home Video, Artvision and many others.

In 1995 he was employed on a permanent basis by Polsat television, where he became the station's main reader, he read almost all films and series, as well as trailers announcing their broadcasts. In 1996 he returned to work with Polonia 1, where he was a reader in the programs: Pełnym gazem, Escape, Nie tylko na weekend and Fachowiec radzi.

In 2005, he was one of the main lectors in films and series on Tele 5. Also in the same year, he provided a voice-over narrative in the controversial Heyah mobile advertisements. He also read in many election advertisements of various political parties, including the controversial National Revival of Poland. In 2005–2007, he read in the TVN24 Kronika filmowa program. In 2006 he was a co-host of the TV program Re:akcja on TVP1. He was a lector in the program Uwaga! Pirat on TVN Turbo and Stop drogówka on TV4.

In 2008, he recorded voice messages for the passenger information system in the vehicles of Warsaw's Public Transport Authority (voice announcements regarding the route).

In 2013, he appeared in two cabaret skits in the program Dzięki Bogu już weekend on TVP2. In September 2014, he made a guest appearance in the 46th episode of its Retro series.

Personal life 
His son Maciej Knapik is a TV journalist.

Death 
He died on 6 September 2021 at the age of 77. On 13 September 2021, his ashes were buried in the family grave at the Powązki Cemetery. In October 2022, a bus stop in Warsaw Bródno was named in his honor.

References

External links
 
 

1943 births
2021 deaths
People from Warsaw
Warsaw University of Technology alumni
Academic staff of the Warsaw University of Technology
Polish engineers
Polish television personalities
Burials at Powązki Cemetery